Carabus blaptoides is a species of ground beetle in the family Carabidae that can be found in Japan and Russia. The species are black coloured, but could have either purple or green pronotum.

Subspecies include:
 Carabus blaptoides blaptoides
 Carabus blaptoides oxuroides
 Carabus blaptoides rugipennis
†Carabus blaptoides hanae

References

blaptoides
Beetles described in 1836
Taxa named by Vincenz Kollar